Le ali della vita (The Wings of Life) is an Italian television miniseries directed by Stefano Reali.

Cast
Characters season 1
 Sabrina Ferilli: Rosanna Ranzi
 Virna Lisi: Sister Alberta
 Ute Maria Lerner: Sister Federica
 Tobias Hoesl: Dr. Vithold Heisler
 Giovanna Di Rauso: Stefania
 Rita Del Piano: Sister Celestina
 Azzurra Antonacci: Alice
 Myriam Catania: Nicoletta Armandi
 Carolina Felline: Elena
 Emanuela Aurizi: Monica
 Giulia Bagella: Nadia
 Marisa Merlini: Sister Adele
 Pino Micol: prefect Armandi
 Roberto Chevalier: Giuseppe
 Carlo Reali: bishop Joseph Gargitter 
 Andrea Tidona: Pietro
 Antonio Carli: Bolzano student
 Paolo Bonanni: Mario
 Mirta Pepe: Luisa
 Carla Ortenzi: Maria
 Paola Tiziana Cruciani: Giorgia
Characters season 2
 Sabrina Ferilli: Rosanna Ranzi
 Virna Lisi: Sister Alberta
 Giovanna Di Rauso: Stefania
 Rita Del Piano: Sister Celestina
 Pier Luigi Coppola: Fabrizio / Emanuele Villoresi
 Renato De Carmine: Gherardo Villoresi
 Lia Tanzi: Olga Villoresi
 Gino Lavagetto: prof Maurizio Lorenzi
 Ivan Bacchi: lawyer Nicola La Torre
 Emilio Bonucci: prof Giusti
 Glauco Onorato: judge Giulio Cortesi
 Marisa Merlini: Sister Adele
 Roberto Stocchi: priest
 Paolo Buglioni: Sarti
 Danny Baldin: Andrea
 Domenico Fortunato: Salvatore De Maria
 Pia Velsi: Sister Rosalia
 Luigi Di Majo: public minister
 Francesco Benigno: Piero

See also
List of Italian television series

External links
 

Italian television series
2000 Italian television series debuts
2001 Italian television series endings
Canale 5 original programming